The Guru Gita (Song of the Guru) is a Hindu scripture that is said to have been authored by the sage Vyasa. The verses of this scripture may also be chanted. The text is part of the larger Skanda Purana. There are several versions of the Guru Gita, varying from around 100 to over 400 verses. Another view is that Guru Gita is part of Viswasara Tantra.

In the Siddha Yoga tradition, the Guru Gita is considered to be an "indispensable text"; few other traditions also share that view. Muktananda chose 182 verses  to create a unique version of the Guru Gita, which has its own melody for chanting.

The text of the Guru Gita describes a conversation between the Hindu God, Lord Shiva and his wife, the Hindu Goddess Parvati, in which she asks him how to achieve liberation. Shiva answers her by describing the Guru principle, the proper ways of worshiping the Guru and the methods and benefits of repeating the Guru Gita.

Etymology

'Guru' means 'heavy' in Sanskrit (e.g., the 'guru'/'laghu' distinction between heavy and light syllables in Paninian grammar, cf. Ashtadhyayi 1.4.11). Even so, the Guru Gita text gives an alternative, folk etymology of the word Guru, in which the root gu stands for darkness, while the root ru stands for light. The term Guru is therefore explained as the remover of darkness, who reveals the light of the heart.

In popular culture

The text was part of the 2010 film Eat, Pray, Love starring Julia Roberts.

Bibliography 

 The Nectar of chanting: Sacred texts and mantras sung in the ashrams of Swami Muktananda: Sanskrit transliteration with English translations SYDA Foundation Rev. ed edition (1978) 
 Paramhansa Pranavadarshan, Shri Guru Gita, Pranava, Inc. (2001)

References

External links 

Shri Guru Gita in English, Hindi, and MP3

Hindu texts
Bhakti movement
Sanskrit texts